The 1941 Paris–Tours was the 35th edition of the Paris–Tours cycle race and was held on 11 May 1941. The race started in Paris and finished in Tours. The race was won by Paul Maye.

General classification

References

1941 in French sport
1941
May 1941 sports events